Alawusa, commonly known as Alausa is a principal district in Ikeja, the state capital of Lagos State. It is the seat of the Lagos State Secretariat and offices of the Governor and Deputy-Governor of Lagos State. Alawusa also has a vibrant and growing Central Business District with several multinational business concerns like Cadbury Nigeria Plc and many others having their offices located in the area. It also has many low density residential estates like the Cornerstone Estate; MKO Abiola Gardens located within it.

On October 4, 2020. Alhaji Muftau Toyin Bhadmus of the Odewale ruling house  was installed as the new Baale of Alausa, Ikeja.

Populated places in Lagos State